Christopher Liebig (born 18 January 1987) is a German international rugby union player, playing for the Heidelberger RK in the Rugby-Bundesliga and the German national rugby union team.

Liebig played in the 2009, 2010 and 2011 German championship final for Heidelberger RK, losing the first one and winning the following two.

He plays rugby since 1991. His brother, Steffen Liebig, is also a German international.

He made his debut for Germany against Portugal on 21 February 2009.

Honours

Club
 German rugby union championship
 Champions: 2010, 2011, 2012
 Runners up: 2009
 German rugby union cup
 Winners: 2011

Stats
Christopher Liebig's personal statistics in club and international rugby:

Club

 As of 11 May 2012

National team

 As of 15 December 2010

References

External links
 Christopher Liebig at scrum.com
   Christopher Liebig at totalrugby.de
  Christopher Liebig at the DRV website

1987 births
Living people
German rugby union players
Germany international rugby union players
Heidelberger RK players
Rugby union wings